Ivan Franceschini (born 7 December 1976) is an Italian football coach and former player, who played as a defender.

Career
A native of Parma, Franceschini started his career at Parma AC. In 1996–97 season, he was loaned to Olympique de Marseille in Ligue 1. In June 1997, Franceschini returned to Parma but went to Salernitana in Serie B in October. The next season, he played for Lucchese, also in Serie B. In the summer of 1999, he signed for Genoa of Serie B. In the next season he signed for Chievo in November 2000, where he won  promotion to Serie A. In summer 2001, he signed for Reggina in a co-ownership deal. At Reggina, he won promotion to Serie A again, and played 4 straight season at Italian top division. In July 2006, he signed for Torino which recently promoted back to Serie A. He was the regular in the first season but dropped in the second season.

After released by Torino in June 2009, he signed a contract until end of season for Cesena in November.

After one season with Cesena, his contract was not renewed and he was without a club until 28 December 2010 when he signed a short-term deal with Portogruaro.

From 2011 until 2013 he played for HinterReggio in Serie D.

Honours
Salernitana
Serie B: 1997–98

References

External links
  Profile at FIGC
  Profile at Football.it
 

Italian footballers
Italy under-21 international footballers
Italian expatriate footballers
Parma Calcio 1913 players
Olympique de Marseille players
U.S. Salernitana 1919 players
S.S.D. Lucchese 1905 players
Genoa C.F.C. players
A.C. ChievoVerona players
Reggina 1914 players
Torino F.C. players
A.C. Cesena players
Serie A players
Serie B players
Serie D players
Ligue 1 players
Expatriate footballers in France
Italian expatriate sportspeople in France
Association football central defenders
Sportspeople from Parma
1976 births
Living people
Italian football managers
Footballers from Emilia-Romagna